Son Hwa-yeon (born 15 March 1997) is a South Korean footballer who plays as a striker for the Incheon Hyundai Steel Red Angels in the WK League and the South Korea national team.

Club career
On 27 December 2017, Son was drafted second overall in the 2018 WK League Draft by Changnyeong WFC. On 23 April 2018, she made her debut in a 1–0 away loss to Suwon UDC. On 30 April 2018, she scored her first goal in a 4–2 home loss to Incheon Hyundai Steel Red Angels.

International career
Son scored four goals at the 2015 AFC U-19 Women's Championship, helping South Korea finish third and qualify for the 2016 FIFA U-20 Women's World Cup. On 3 July 2017, she was named in the squad for the 2017 Summer Universiade; she went on to score three times in the tournament. On 4 June 2016, she scored twice on her senior debut, in a 5–0 win over Myanmar.

International goals
Scores and results list South Korea's goal tally first, score column indicates score after each Son goal.

References

External links
 

1997 births
Living people
South Korean women's footballers
South Korea women's under-17 international footballers
South Korea women's under-20 international footballers
South Korea women's international footballers
Women's association football forwards
Footballers at the 2018 Asian Games
Asian Games bronze medalists for South Korea
Asian Games medalists in football
Medalists at the 2018 Asian Games
2019 FIFA Women's World Cup players
Incheon Hyundai Steel Red Angels WFC players
WK League players